Dr. J.A. Hay House, also known as Nelson House, is a historic home located at La Grange, Lewis County, Missouri. It was built about 1854, and is a -story, three bay, massed plan, brick dwelling with Greek Revival style design elements.  It has a -story frame rear ell.

It was listed on the National Register of Historic Places in 1999.

References

Houses on the National Register of Historic Places in Missouri
Greek Revival houses in Missouri
Houses completed in 1854
Buildings and structures in Lewis County, Missouri
National Register of Historic Places in Lewis County, Missouri